New Day Dawning is the fifth studio album by American country music artist Wynonna, released in 2000. It produced only two chart singles on the Billboard Hot Country Singles and Tracks (now Hot Country Songs) charts: "Can't Nobody Love You (Like I Do)" at #31, and "Going Nowhere" at #43. Also included are cover versions of Joni Mitchell's "Help Me" and the Fabulous Thunderbirds' "Tuff Enuff".

Initial presses of the album included a bonus EP called Big Bang Boogie. This four-song EP reunited Wynonna with her mother, Naomi Judd, with whom Wynonna recorded as the Judds in the 1980s and early 1990s before going solo in 1991. All four songs on the EP are credited to the Judds. Of these, "Stuck in Love" was released as a single, charting at #26 on the country charts in 2000 and producing the Judds' first chart single in nearly a decade.

Track listing

New Day Dawning
"Going Nowhere" (Paul Begaud, Vanessa Corish, Kye Fleming) - 4:09
"New Day Dawning" (Judson Spence) - 3:35
"Can't Nobody Love You (Like I Do)" (Cathy Majeski, Danny Orton) - 3:18
"Chain Reaction" (Gary Nicholson, Kenny Greenberg) - 4:15
"Help Me" (Joni Mitchell) - 3:30
"I've Got Your Love" (Leonard Albstrom, Mark Anderson, Buck Moore) - 3:50
"Tuff Enuff" (Kim Wilson) - 4:10
"Who Am I Trying to Fool" (Rob Mathes) - 4:34
"Lost Without You" (Tina Arena, David Tyson, Christopher Ward) - 3:29
"He Rocks" (Tracy Hagans, Ted Hewitt, Troy Seals) - 2:45
"Learning to Live with Love Again" (Nicholson, Mike Reid) - 4:03
"I Can't Wait to Meet You" (Macy Gray, Jeremy Ruzumna, Daryle Swann, Miles Tackett) - 4:55

Big Bang Boogie
"Stuck in Love" (Kim Patton-Johnston, Nicholson) - 3:48
"Big Bang Boogie" (Naomi Judd, Nicholson) - 3:10
"That's What Makes You Strong" (Jesse Winchester) - 4:20
"The 90's Was the 60's Turned Upside Down" (Marshall Chapman, Nicholson) - 4:25

Personnel

New Day Dawning 
 Wynonna Judd – lead vocals 
 John Hobbs – keyboards (1-7, 9, 10, 11), organ (1-7, 9, 10, 11)
 Steve Nathan – keyboards (1-7, 9, 10), organ (1-7, 9, 10)
 Matt Rollings – keyboards (1-7, 9, 10), acoustic piano (1-7, 9, 10), organ (1-7, 9, 10)
 Tony Harrell – keyboards (8, 12), organ (8, 12)
 Rob Mathes – keyboards (8, 12), synthesizers (8, 12), string arrangements (8, 12)
 John Barlow Jarvis – acoustic piano (8, 12)
 Steuart Smith – electric guitar
 Jerry McPherson – electric guitar (1, 3-7, 9, 10)
 Biff Watson – acoustic guitar (1-7, 9, 10, 11)
 Richard Bennett – acoustic guitar (8), electric guitar (11)
 Paul Franklin – steel guitar (1, 3-7, 9, 10)
 Willie Weeks – bass
 John Robinson – drums (1-7, 9, 10, 11)
 Steve Potts – drums (8, 12)
 Terry McMillan – percussion (1, 3-7, 9, 10)
 Eric Darken – percussion (2, 8)
 Aubrey Haynie – fiddle (1-7, 9, 10, 11)
 Kim Wilson – harmonica (7)
 Mark Douthit – flute (5), alto saxophone (5), baritone saxophone (5)
 Jim Horn – tenor saxophone (12), baritone saxophone (12)
 Barry Green – trombone (12)
 Mike Haynes – trumpet (12)
 Carl Gorodetzky – string conductor (8, 12)
 The Nashville String Machine – strings (8, 12)
 Bob Bailey – backing vocals
 Tabitha Fair – backing vocals
 Kim Fleming – backing vocals
 Vicki Hampton – backing vocals
 Kim Keyes – backing vocals
 Judson Spence – backing vocals

Big Bang Boogie 
 Wynonna Judd – vocals
 Naomi Judd – vocals
 John Barlow Jarvis – acoustic piano, Wurlitzer electric piano
 Tony Harrell – keyboards, synthesizers, organ 
 Steve Nathan – keyboards, organ 
 Richard Bennett – acoustic guitar, electric guitar 
 Jerry McPherson – electric guitar
 Bruce Bouton – lap steel guitar, steel guitar 
 Aubrey Haynie – mandolin, fiddle
 Carl Marsh – sitar
 Willie Weeks – bass
 Glenn Worf – upright bass
 Eddie Bayers – drums 
 Eric Darken – percussion 
 Jim Horn – baritone saxophone, soprano saxophone, tenor saxophone 
 Barry Green – trombone 
 Mike Haynes – trumpet 
 Rob Mathes – string arrangements
 Carl Gorodetzky – string conductor 
 The Nashville String Machine – strings
 Bob Bailey – backing vocals
 Kim Fleming – backing vocals
 Vicki Hampton – backing vocals

Production
 Producers – Tony Brown (Tracks #2 & 11), Gary Nicholson (Tracks #8 & 12; Bonus Tracks #1-4), James Stroud (Tracks #1, 3-7, 9 & 10), Wynonna (Tracks #1-12).
 A&R – Claudia Mize
 Production Coordination – Marla Burns, Tammy Luker, Nathan Nicholson, Jessie Noble and Doug Rich.
 Engineers – Jeff Balding, Derek Bason, Richard Hansen, Julian King and Dan Rodin.
 Assistant Engineers – Ricky Cobble, Greg Fowler, Jedd Hackett, Mark Hagen, Richard Hansen and Matt Weeks.
 Strings engineered by Ronnie Brookshire
 Mixing – Chuck Ainlay and Ed Cherney
 Mix Assistants – Tony Green and Kevin Syzmanski
 Digital Editing: Eric Conn and Carlos Grier
 Mastered by Denny Purcell at Georgetown Masters (Nashville, TN).
 Design – Chris Ferrara
 Photography – Randee St. Nicholas
 Stylists – Danny Flynn and Robert Vetica
 Make-up – Troy Jensen

Charts

References
Allmusic (see infobox)

Wynonna Judd albums
Curb Records albums
Mercury Nashville albums
Albums produced by James Stroud
albums produced by Tony Brown (record producer)
2000 albums